Akshay Oberoi (born 1 January 1985) is an American actor of Indian descent, who works in Hindi films. After making his acting debut as a child in the 2002 comedy-drama American Chai, Oberoi played his first leading role in Rajshri Productions film Isi Life Mein (2010). Oberoi has received critical acclaim for his work.

Early life, family and education
Akshay Oberoi was born on 1 January 1985 in Morristown, Morris County, New Jersey, United States. He attended Newark Academy for middle school and high school and pursued a bachelor's degree in Theater Arts and Economics at Johns Hopkins University in Baltimore. He also completed acting training in Stella Adler in New York City and then Playhouse West in Los Angeles, where he learned the Meisner technique. During his education, he studied acting under John Astin from The Addams Family. He also studied ballet, jazz and hip-hop dance at Broadway Dance Center. He moved to India and did plays at the famous Prithvi Theatre and received training from Kishore Namit Kapoor.

Akshay's father, Krishan Oberoi, is the brother of the actor Suresh Oberoi and thus Akshay is first cousin to Vivek Oberoi.

Career
Oberoi started his career by working at the famed Prithvi Theatre in Juhu with Makrand Deshpande. Starting with backstage work, Makrand later offered him a part in Miss Beautiful.

Oberoi then made his film debut in Sooraj Barjatya's Isi Life Mein. On its release the film failed to click at the box office. However, Oberoi was lauded by the critics for his work in the film. Taran Adarsh from Bollywood Hungama commented, "The only noteworthy aspect of the film is its lead pair. Akshay Oberoi is talented – no two opinions on that. He has good screen presence, but most importantly, he acts very well." Prathna Tiwari of BollySpice said, "The newcomers definitely are off to a good start. In particular Akshay Oberoi who has great screen presence, delivers his dialogues confidently and also proves to be eye candy for the ladies." Sarita Tanwar of Mid-Day noted, "Newcomer Akshay Oberoi is confident and delivers."

Oberoi moved to television work post the release of his first film. In 2012, he played the lead role in Bejoy Nambiar's MTV Rush. Nambiar, impressed with Oberoi's work on the show, offered him his second film, the Tamil remake of the suspense thriller Pizza. Pizza released on 18 July 2014, where Oberoi was once again praised by the critics. Renuka Vyavahare of The Times of India said, "Lead actor Akshay Oberoi does complete justice to the spine-chilling story with [his] compelling presence. We would like to see [this] actor more often on screen..." Taran Adarsh commented, "One witnesses a noticeable growth in Akshay Oberoi's performance, who interprets the challenging role with sincerity. The varied emotions that he gets to exhibit – anxiety, fright, vulnerability – come across well in several sequences" Sweta Kaushal of Hindustan Times noted, "An effortless performance by Akshay Oberoi make this horror flick worth a one-time watch." Subhash K. Jha said, "Akshay Oberoi's Kunal is a mixture of the timid and the defiant. He lets the character's confusions build up as the story progresses so that finally we see him as a victim in ways that we would never suspect otherwise. " Shubha Shetty-Saha of Mid-Day stated, "This remake...solely rests on the still young shoulders of newcomer Akshay Oberoi, who has to go through a range of emotions in the 120 plus minutes long duration of the film. A dream role for someone who's just about a film old, Pizza 3D has Oberoi in almost every frame and must say, he has done a decent job." Sneha May Francis of Emirates 24/7 noted, "Akshay Oberoi holds [the] fort impressively. He's impeccable as the timid Kunal, exploiting his insecurities and fears with maturity and restraint. For a bloke fresh on the Bollywood trail, that's bloody impressive..."

Oberoi has also received rave reviews for his work in Laal Rang and Gurgaon. Maggie Lee of Variety said of his work in Gurgaon, "Oberoi oozes bad-boy sexiness, injecting physical potency into Nikki's loose-canon behavior." and Film Campion's Rahul Desai said, "Oberoi's light-eyed cold-bloodedness lends credence to Gurgaons volatility in a way that lets the film take any unresolved direction it chooses to." While Subhash K. Jha said, "it's Akshay Oberoi playing the outcast son who steals the thunder lighting and what-not. It's a big-bang performance, implosive and bursting at the seams with unspoken bitterness. Oberoi plays the truant son (a cliché in the crime genre) with much empathy and little compassion. In one sequence we see him brutally violate a prostitute in a bath tub. We know what levels of violence Nikki is cabable of. Nikki doesn't disappoint."

Media 
Oberoi was ranked in The Times Most Desirable Men at No. 31 in 2020.

Personal life
On 24 March 2011, Oberoi married Jyothi Vynatheya, a strategy consultant with Dalberg Global Development Advisors. Akshay first met Jyothi at Newark Academy. Their son, Avyaan, was born in April 2017.

Filmography

Films

Web series

Short films

References

External links

Living people
1985 births
People from Morristown, New Jersey
American male stage actors
American male film actors
American male television actors
Punjabi people
Punjabi Hindus
American male actors of Indian descent
Johns Hopkins University alumni
Male actors in Hindi cinema
Male actors in Hindi television
American emigrants to India
American expatriate actors in India
21st-century American male actors